Bulamaji or Boolamaji may refer to:
 Bulamaji, Zanjan
 Bulamaji, Khodabandeh, Zanjan Province